Javaran (}, also Romanized as Javārān; also known as Jawārūn, Marjān (Persian: مرجان), and Marjun) is a village in Javaran Rural District, Hanza District, Rabor County, Kerman Province, Iran. At the 2006 census, its population was 804, in 213 families.

References 

Populated places in Rabor County